Eva Hansen may refer to:
 Eva Hemmer Hansen (1913–1983), Danish journalist, novelist, translator and feminist
 Eva Kjer Hansen (born 1964), Danish politician
 Eva Kristin Hansen (born 1973), Norwegian politician